Josué Méndez (born September 18, 1976, in Lima, Peru) is a Peruvian director of films including Dias de Santiago (Days of Santiago) and Dioses (Gods). Dias de Santiago is about a cab driver in Lima, Peru. It was Peru's official nomination into the 2006 Academy Awards.

See also
 Claudia Llosa
 Francisco Lombardi
 Alberto Durant

References

Living people
People from Lima
Peruvian film directors
1976 births